A compound of octahedra may be:
Compound of two octahedra
Compound of three octahedra
 Also Compound of three triangular antiprisms
Compound of four octahedra
 More generally, Compound of four octahedra with rotational freedom
Compound of five octahedra
Compound of eight octahedra with rotational freedom
Compound of ten octahedra
Compound of twenty octahedra
More generally, Compound of twenty octahedra with rotational freedom

Polyhedral compounds